The Children of the Dead is a novel by Elfriede Jelinek, first published in 1995 by Rowohlt Verlag. It is commonly regarded as her magnum opus. The novel won the Literaturpreis der Stadt Bremen in 1996. The prologue and epilogue were translated into English by Louise E. Stoehr in 1998, while a full English translation by Gitta Honegger is forthcoming. 

Next to Jelinek's novel Neid, The Children of the Dead is her longest work. Although it can be classified as a postmodern horror novel, Jelinek herself calls it a "ghost story written in the tradition of the Gothic novel."

The novel constitutes an intensive examination of the memory and suppression of the Holocaust. Along with this goes an associative mode of writing which incorporates plays on words and constantly disrupts linear narration through looping and repeated narrative strands.

Plot
The novel is unusual amongst literary works in German in that all the characters are undead in the process of decomposition and are presented as mute zombies in the manner of splatter films. Of these undead protagonists, the three primary are Gudrun Bichler, Edgar Gstranz and Karin Frenzel; they are incapable of speech, obsessed with sex, and brutal. They are confronted with the mass of Holocaust victims, who wish to achieve new life by means of the couple, Gudrun and Edgar; however their plan fails since Gudrun and Edgar are likewise undead. The setting dissolves into a sea of mud.

Adaptations
In 2019, directors Kelly Copper and Pavol Liska collaborated on a feature film adaptation, Die Kinder der Toten, in a comedy horror style.

References

Further reading
Ballhausen, Thomas / Krenn, Günter: This is Hell: Elfriede Jelinek’s „Children of the Dead“ and Her Rewriting of Herk Harvey’s „Carnival of Soul“. In: Autelitano, Alice / Re, Valentina (Hg.): il racconto del film. narrating the film. Udine 2006.
Gsoels-Lorensen, Jutta: Elfriede Jelinek's "Die Kinder der Toten": Representing the Holocaust as an Austrian Ghost Story. In: Germanic Review. Volume 81, No 4, Autumn 2006.
Just, Rainer: Zeichenleichen - Reflexionen über das Untote im Werk Elfriede Jelineks.
Kecht, Maria Regina: The Polyphony of Remembrance. Reading „Die Kinder der Toten“ [„The Children of the Dead“]. In: Lamb-Faffelberger, Margarete / Konzett, Matthias P. (Hg.): Elfriede Jelinek. Writing Woman, Nation, and Identity. Madison 2007. S. 189-220.
Ortner, Jessica: Poetologie „nach Auschwitz“. Narratologie, Semantik und sekundäre Zeugenschaft in Elfriede Jelineks Roman „Die Kinder der Toten“. Kopenhagen, Diss. 2012.
Wilson, Ian W.: Greeting the Holocaust's Dead? Narrative Strategies and the Undead in Elfriede Jelinek's „Die Kinder der Toten“. In: Modern Austrian Literature. Vol. 39, No. 3/4, 2006. S. 27-55.

Novels by Elfriede Jelinek
1995 Austrian novels
Rowohlt Verlag books
Novels about the Holocaust